The 1994 NCAA Division I Women's Lacrosse Championship was the 13th annual single-elimination tournament to determine the national champion of Division I NCAA women's college lacrosse. The championship game was played at Byrd Stadium in College Park, Maryland during May 1994.  All NCAA Division I women's lacrosse programs were eligible for this championship; a total of 6 teams were invited to participate.

Princeton defeated Maryland, 10–7, to win their first national championship.

The leading scorer for the tournament, with 10 goals, was Kelly Amonte from Maryland. The Most Outstanding Player trophy was not awarded this year.

Teams

Tournament bracket

Tournament outstanding players 
Kelly Amonte, Maryland
Betsy Elder, Maryland
Laura Harmon, Maryland
Theresa Ingram, Maryland
Patty Parichy, Maryland
Jenny Bristow, Princeton
Cherie Greer, Virginia
Abigail Gutstein, Princeton
Erin O'Neill, Princeton

See also 
 NCAA Division I Women's Lacrosse Championship
 NCAA Division III Women's Lacrosse Championship
 1994 NCAA Division I Men's Lacrosse Championship

References

NCAA Division I Women's Lacrosse Championship
NCAA Division I Women's Lacrosse Championship
NCAA Women's Lacrosse Championship